Ivica Tucak (born 8 February 1970) is a Croatian professional water polo coach and former player who has been the head coach of the Croatia men's national water polo team since 16 September 2012. 

Winning the gold medal at the 2017 World Championship, silver medals at the 2015 World Championship and 2016 Summer Olympics, and the bronze medal at the 2018 European Championship, he has been the most successful coach of the Croatia national team.

Playing career
Tucak started his professional playing career with the junior team of his hometown club VK Šibenik, where he stayed until 1989, playing together with the famous Croatian player, Perica Bukić.

In 1989, he signed with Belgrade-based club Crvena zvezda. In 1991, he went to Switzerland and signed for Bissone Lugano. In 1993, he returned to his home–VK Šibenik–and stayed there for two years, after Tucak went to Italy and played for Como/Snam Milano and Sori until 2002. He then came back to Croatia, and played for VK Medveščak until 2004. He finished his career in 2005 at his hometown club VK Šibenik.

During his professional career, he was not a member of the senior Croatia men's national water polo team.

Coaching career
Tucak started his head coaching career at his hometown club VK Šibenik, managing them to reach the LEN Euro Cup final game in the 2006–07 season. In 2009, he became head coach of Montenegrin First League club PVK Jadran, with which he won two Adriatic Leagues and one national league and cup title.

National team coaching career
In 2005, Tucak started to work as coach of the junior men's Croatia national team along Veselin Đuho, winning the bronze medal at the 2008 European Championship in Belgrade, and the gold medal at the 2009 World Championship in Šibenik.

From 2010 until 2011, Tucak worked as assistant to the head coach of the senior Croatia men's team, Ratko Rudić, while in September 2012, he succeeded him. With Croatia, he won the 2017 World Championship tournament in Hungary.

Personal life
Born in Šibenik, Tucak graduated from the water polo at the Zagreb Faculty of Kinesiology in 2013, where his mentor was the famous Croatian water polo player, Dubravko Šimenc. In 2010, City of Šibenik awarded Tucak for the best coach in Šibenik in 2009.

Tucak, with his wife Marijana, had a daughter Tena who died tragically in June 2005, at the age of 3. 

Tucak is awarded for the best coach in the world by FINA, in December 2017.

Honours

Coach
VK Šibenik NCP
 LEN Euro Cup runner-up: 2006–07

PVK Jadran
 Regional League A1: 2009–10, 2010–11
 Montenegrin League: 2009–10, 2011–12
 Montenegrin Cup: 2010–11

See also
 List of world champions in men's water polo

References

External links
 

1970 births
Living people
Sportspeople from Šibenik
Croatian male water polo players
Croatian water polo coaches
Croatia men's national water polo team coaches
Water polo coaches at the 2016 Summer Olympics
Water polo coaches at the 2020 Summer Olympics